The Erdeniin Tobchi (summary of the Khans' treasure) is a national chronicle of the Mongols written by Saghang Sechen in 1662.

The Erdeniin Tobchi is commonly called The Chronicles of Sagang Sechen. A first translation into a western language (German) was published by the Moravian missionary Isaac Jacob Schmidt in 1829. The English translation by John Krueger is called The Bejeweled Summary of the Origin of the Khan: A History of the Eastern Mongols to 1662.

It is generally regarded by nearly all ancient Mongolists as a primary source of accurate Mongol history. The names in this work were reputed to be uncorrupted. Erdeniin Tobchi'''s records of Mongol rulers were so different from Altan Tobchi in Mongolian and Habib al-siyar, Zafarnama in Persian that modern Mongolists consider Saghang Sechen's records to be inaccurate.

See also
 Altan Tobchi The Secret History of the Mongols Altan Debter''

Notes 

1662 books
Legal history of Mongolia
Mongolian literature
Books about legal history